The High Commission of Bangladesh, London is the chief diplomatic mission of Bangladesh to the United Kingdom. The High Commission is located on the Queen's Gate street of South Kensington in London. The Government of Bangladesh also operates two Assistant High Commissions located in Manchester and Birmingham. Moreover, it has concurrent accreditation to Ireland. 

The current High Commissioner is Saida Muna Tasneem who has served in the role since November 2018. The building, alongside the Royal Thai Embassy, is a Grade II listed building.

Gallery

References

External links
 Official site

London
Bangladesh
Bangladesh and the Commonwealth of Nations
United Kingdom and the Commonwealth of Nations
Bangladesh–United Kingdom relations